Scott Alexander Carroll (born September 24, 1984) is an American former professional baseball pitcher. He played in Major League Baseball (MLB) for the Chicago White Sox.

Early career
Carroll attended Liberty High School in Liberty, Missouri, where he was a star quarterback and pitcher. He signed a scholarship with Purdue University to play football. Carroll never received an opportunity for playing time, as he was stuck behind future NFL quarterback Kyle Orton. He later transferred to Missouri State University, where he again was the starting quarterback and a top pitcher on the baseball team. In 2006, he played collegiate summer baseball with the Falmouth Commodores of the Cape Cod Baseball League.

Cincinnati Reds
The Reds drafted him in the third round of the 2007 Major League Baseball Draft.

He played six games for Billings, the rookie class team, in 2007. He was 0–1 with a 2.93 ERA. Carroll played for Class A Dayton and Class A-Advanced Sarasota in 2008. He was a combined 7–7 with a 3.60 ERA in 9 games for the Dragons and 14 for Sarasota. He played 7 games at Sarasota in 2009, going 2–2 with a 2.68 ERA. In a two-game promotion to Double-A Carolina, he gave up five earned runs in five innings, getting no decisions. In 2010, he played for the Class A Lynchburg Hillcats and the Mudcats, going a combined 4–11 with a 3.36 ERA in 5 games at Lynchburg and 20 at Carolina. He received a non-roster invitation to spring training for 2011. During the 2012 season, Carroll was released by the Reds and signed with the White Sox. Carroll pitched in one game with the White Sox Double-A Birmingham before being promoted to the Sox Triple-A affiliate Charlotte. Carroll was a combined 4–6 with an ERA of 4.48 and 65 strikeouts in 35 games between Louisville, Birmingham and Charlotte. Carroll spent most of the 2013 season on the disabled list. When activated, he rehabbed at the Rookie-level with the Bristol White Sox and then went to Double-A Birmingham. He finished the 2013 season with a combined record of 0–2 in 11 games (11 starts),  innings, 3.29 ERA, 42 hits, 6 walks and 29 strikeouts.

Major Leagues

Chicago White Sox
Carroll made his major league debut on April 27, 2014. He was designated for assignment on November 25, 2014. Carroll rejoined the White Sox on a minor league deal signed on January 22, 2015. On July 14, 2016, Carroll was outrighted by the White Sox.

Texas Rangers
Scott Carroll was acquired by the Texas Rangers on July 20, 2016.

Chicago Cubs
On August 15, 2017, Carroll signed a minor league deal with the Chicago Cubs. He elected free agency on November 6, 2017.

Kansas City T-Bones
On June 2, 2018, Carroll signed with the Kansas City T-Bones of the independent American Association.

Toros de Tijuana
On July 3, 2018, Carroll signed with the Toros de Tijuana of the Mexican League. He was released on July 27, 2018.

References

External links

Missouri State Bears bio
Purdue Boilermakers football bio

1984 births
Living people
American football quarterbacks
Billings Mustangs players
Birmingham Barons players
Bristol White Sox players
Carolina Mudcats players
Charlotte Knights players
Chicago White Sox players
Dayton Dragons players
Falmouth Commodores players
Frisco RoughRiders players
Leones del Caracas players
American expatriate baseball players in Venezuela
Louisville Bats players
Lynchburg Hillcats players
Major League Baseball pitchers
Missouri State Bears baseball players
Missouri State Bears football players
Missouri State University alumni
People from Liberty, Missouri
Purdue Boilermakers football players
Purdue University alumni
Round Rock Express players
Sarasota Reds players
Baseball players from Kansas City, Missouri
Players of American football from Kansas City, Missouri
Kansas City T-Bones players
Iowa Cubs players